is a professional Japanese baseball player. He plays pitcher for the Orix Buffaloes.

References 

1992 births
Living people
Baseball people from Osaka
Nippon Professional Baseball pitchers
Orix Buffaloes players